Ace High is a 1919 American short silent Western film directed by George Holt and featuring Hoot Gibson.

Cast
 Pete Morrison
 Magda Lane
 Hoot Gibson
 Helene Rosson credited as Helen Rosson
 Jack Walters
 Martha Mattox

Note
 A film with identical title starred Tom Mix in 1918.

See also
 List of American films of 1919
 Hoot Gibson filmography

References

External links
 

1919 films
1919 Western (genre) films
1919 short films
American black-and-white films
American silent short films
Films directed by George Holt
Silent American Western (genre) films
1910s American films
1910s English-language films